Rockcliffe Cross is a village in the parish of Rockcliffe, in the City of Carlisle district of the county of Cumbria, England. 


Location 
It is located on an unclassified road near the village of Rockcliffe and about seven miles away from the city of Carlisle. It is near the River Eden and the River Esk and the England/Scotland border. There is the M6 motorway a few miles away, which was the A74 road until it was upgraded and access to it was restricted.

References 
 Philip's Street Atlas Cumbria (page 19)

External links

 
 

Hamlets in Cumbria
Rockcliffe, Cumbria